Scandia is an academic journal for history which has been published since 1928, when it was established by the Swedish historian Lauritz Weibull (1873-1960). The journal, which has a Scandinavian scope, is, and has always been, affiliated with the Department of History at Lund University.

The first volumes of the journal, which have come into the public domain, are available online as scans and OCR text at Projekt Runeberg.

External links
 
Entry in Libris, stable link
Scandia at Projekt Runeberg.

European history journals
Swedish-language journals
Publications established in 1928
Scandinavian history
Biannual journals
Lund University
1928 establishments in Sweden
Academic journals associated with universities and colleges